The Presbyterian Church is a branch of Reformed Protestant Christianity originating in the British Isles.

Presbyterian Church may also refer to:

United Kingdom 
Church of Scotland
Presbyterian Church of Wales
United Free Church of Scotland, a union of Presbyterian churches
English Presbyterianism

United States 
Presbyterian Church (USA), the largest Presbyterian denomination in the U.S.
Presbyterian Church in America, the largest evangelical Presbyterian denomination in the U.S.

Specific places
Presbyterian Church Building (Oxford, Indiana)
Presbyterian Church (Bellevue, Nebraska)
Presbyterian Church (Beaver, Oklahoma)

See also
List of Presbyterian churches
List of Presbyterian and Reformed denominations in North America
American Presbyterian Church (disambiguation)
First Presbyterian Church (disambiguation)
Old Presbyterian Church (disambiguation)
Free Presbyterian Church (disambiguation)
The Presbytere